Carroll may refer to:

People
 Carroll (given name)
 Carroll (surname)
 O'Carroll, also known as Carroll, a Gaelic Irish clan
 Mac Cearbhaill, anglicised as Carroll, a Gaelic Irish clan
 Charles Carroll Webster (1824-1893), American lawyer and politician

Places

Australia
Carroll, New South Wales

United States
Carroll, Iowa
Carroll, Nebraska
Carroll, New Hampshire
Carroll, New York
Carroll, Ohio
Carroll, Texas
Carroll County (disambiguation), various
Carroll Plantation, Maine
Carroll Township (disambiguation), various
Carroll Valley, Pennsylvania
East Carroll Parish, Louisiana
East Carroll Township, Cambria County, Pennsylvania
West Carroll Parish, Louisiana
Mount Carroll, Illinois

Education
Carroll College (Montana)
Carroll University, Waukesha, Wisconsin
John Carroll University, Cleveland, Ohio
Carroll Hall (University of Notre Dame), residence hall 
Carroll School of Management, within Boston College

Court cases
R v Carroll, Australian High Court case
Carroll v. United States, which decided that automobile passengers have a reduced expectation of privacy
United States v. Carroll Towing Co., precedent-setting United States appeals court case

Companies
 Carroll's, Irish tobacco company
 Carroll & Graf Publishers, American book publisher
 Carroll Group, a defunct British property company
 W Carroll Group, a Liverpool-based waste management and construction group

See also

 Carol (disambiguation)
Carrell (disambiguation)
 Carrol
 Caroll
Carrols (disambiguation)